The West Australian Football League (WAFL) has utilised a number of different grounds since its formation in 1885. This list comprises grounds currently in use (that is, used in the 2011 season, grounds formerly in use and defunct grounds.

Most current WAFL grounds were originally constructed for the sole purpose of serving as a home ground for Australian rules football clubs, either by the clubs or local government authorities. Some grounds have also hosted other sports, including rugby league, rugby union, soccer and cricket. Two WAFL venues, the WACA Ground and Subiaco Oval, have also hosted matches in the Australian Football League (AFL).

The competition's grand final was previously held every year at Subiaco Oval (Domain Stadium), but is now played at the newly constructed Perth Stadium (Optus Stadium) in Burswood, it is the largest stadium in Western Australia, with a maximum capacity of 60,000 people. The WAFL's attendance record was set at Subiaco Oval, with 52,781 people attending the 1979 Grand Final.

Grounds

Major grounds

Non-metropolitan grounds

Country venues
Various country towns in Western Australia have hosted WAFL games as a part of the competition's "Country Week", or for similar promotions. Towns which have at least one regular season WAFL game are listed below. The exact name of the ground can often not be determined, but is listed where possible.

See also

List of Australian Football League grounds

References

External links
Venues: WAFL Footy Facts

WAFL grounds